Ivan Viktorovich Zavaliy (born 18 September 1984) is a Russian former professional footballer.

Club career
He made his debut in the Russian Premier League in 2004 for FC Rubin Kazan.

References

1984 births
Living people
Russian footballers
FC SKA Rostov-on-Don players
FC Rubin Kazan players
FC Tom Tomsk players
FC Baltika Kaliningrad players
FC KAMAZ Naberezhnye Chelny players
FC Zvezda Irkutsk players
Russian Premier League players
FC Sodovik Sterlitamak players
Association football forwards
FC SKA-Khabarovsk players